Elizabeth Alindogan Kho (born February 7, 1963, in Sorsogon), known professionally as Liz Alindogan, is an actress in the Philippines.

Career
Alindogan was a model when discovered by comedian Dolphy in a fashion show in Manila Hotel. Her first film was Dolphy's Angels in 1980 with Carmi Martin, Anna Marie Gutierrez, Yehlen Catral and Dolphy.

She did also sexy movies in mid-'80s such as Heartache City with Maria Isabel Lopez, Escort Girls with Jacklyn Jose, Unang Karanasan with George Estregan, Company of Women with Mark Gil, Mga Nakaw Na Sandali with Ronaldo Valdez, and The Diary of Vietnam Rose.

She became the leading lady of action stars like Fernando Poe Jr. in Ang Panday, Ang Aguila at Falcon, and Sierra Madre, Rudy Fernandez in Wanted: Sabas, Dante Varona in Nagbabagang Lupa... Nagbabagang Araw, Ace Vergel in Kapwa Simaron, and Jess Lapid Jr. in Cuadro de Alas.

Alindogan was part of 100 Days to Heaven (2011) of ABS-CBN's television series, starring Coney Reyes, Jodi Sta. Maria and Xyriel Manabat, among others.

Personal life
Her first husband was former action star Jess Lapid Jr. (separated). They had two children.

Alindogan is now married to businessman Benny Kho with whom she has four children.

Filmography

Film
Ang Misis ni Meyor (2013)
Batas Militar (2006)
Alipin ng Aliw (1998)
Espadang Patpat (1990)
Mga Nakaw Na Sandali (1986)
Anak ng Supremo (1986)
The Diary of Vietnam Rose (1986)
Eden (1985)
Ulo Ng Gang-Ho (1985)
Unang Karanasan (1985)
Escort Girls (1985)
Sa Dibdib ng Sierra Madre (1985)
Company of Women (1985)
Kumander Cobra (1984)
Rambo Tanggo Part 3 (1984)
Pugante (1983)
Johnny Tanggo (1982)
Mr. One-Two-Three Part 2 (1981)
Diego Bandido (1981)
Ang Panday (1980)
John & Marsha '80 (1980)
Dolphy's Angels (1980)
Ex-Wife (1980)

Television
Tunay Na Buhay (2011)
100 Days to Heaven (2011)
Recuerdo de Amor (2002)
Maalaala Mo Kaya - "Suman at Ketchup" (2002)
Maalaala Mo Kaya - "Tindahan" (2011)
Maalaala Mo Kaya - "Manika II" (2012)
Maalaala Mo Kaya - "Kandila" (2012)

References

External links

1963 births
Living people
Bicolano actors
Filipino film actresses
People from Sorsogon
Filipino television actresses